Rappahannock may refer to:

People
Rappahannock people, a Native American people in Virginia, United States
 Rappahannock Tribe, Inc., a federally recognized tribe in Virginis

Places in the United States
Rappahannock Academy, Virginia, an unincorporated community in Caroline County, Virginia
Rappahannock County, Virginia
Rappahannock County (1656), Virginia or "Old Rappahannock" County, divided in 1692 to form Essex County and Richmond County, Virginia

Rivers
Rappahannock River, a river in eastern Virginia
Rappahannock River (New Zealand), a river in the Tasman Region of New Zealand

Education
Rappahannock Academy & Military Institute (1813–1873), a school in Caroline County, Virginia
Rappahannock Community College, a two-year college located in Glenns and Warsaw, Virginia
Rappahannock County High School, Washington, Virginia
Rappahannock Industrial Academy (1902–1948), a school for African-American children that operated near Dunnsville, Virginia

Military
Battle of Rappahannock Station I (August 22–August 25, 1862), a battle in the American Civil War
Battle of Rappahannock Station II (November 7, 1863), a battle in the American Civil War

Ships
CSS Rappahannock, a Confederate Army ship in service from 1864 to 1865
SS Rappahannock, a Furness Company steamer from Canada that is said to have passed the RMS Titanic, and possibly even transmitted an ice warning via Morse lamp, on that liner's fateful maiden voyage in 1912
USS Rappahannock (AOG-2), a United States Navy gasoline tanker in service from 1942 to 1957
USS Rappahannock (AF-6), a United States Navy animal transport and store ship in commission from 1917 to 1924
USNS Rappahannock (T-AO-204), a United States Navy fleet replenishment oiler in Military Sealift Command service since 1995

See also
Rappahannock Academy (disambiguation)
Tappahannock, Virginia, town in Essex County, Virginia, United States